Ethan Rains (born as Iman Nazemzadeh on February 19, 1981, in Tehran, Iran) is an Iranian-American actor, best known for his portrayal of Dr. Leo Julian on the second season of SOAPnet's General Hospital: Night Shift, a 13-episode prime time spin-off of the ABC daytime soap opera General Hospital. In December 2011, he guest starred on Days of Our Lives as a bad guy in a storyline involving illegal internet gambling.

Rains' brother Dominic, Rains had played the role in the series' first season in 2007; when he was unavailable for the series' second season in July 2008, Ethan was cast in the role starting 22 July 2008.

In 2009, Rain was featured in the horror film Open Graves as the character Tomás.

In 2019, Rain stars in the movie Samir with Sprague Grayden, Michelle Lukes, and Peter Greene.

Personal life 
He attended The Colony High School and graduated in 1999. He also attended Southern Methodist University and majored in Theatre.

Filmography

Television

Film

Video Games

References

External links 

Ethan Rains at Rotten Tomatoes

1981 births
Living people
20th-century American male actors
21st-century American male actors
20th-century Iranian male actors
21st-century Iranian male actors
American people of Iranian descent
American male soap opera actors
American male television actors
American male voice actors
Iranian male television actors
Iranian male voice actors
Male actors from Tehran